Venustatrochus malaita is a species of sea snail, a marine gastropod mollusk, in the family Calliostomatidae within the superfamily Trochoidea, the top snails, turban snails and their allies.

Distribution
This marine species occurs off the Solomon Islands.

References

External links
  Vilvens, C. (2009). New species and new records of Calliostomatidae Gastropoda: Trochoidea) from New Caledonia and Solomon Islands. Novapex. 10 (4): 125-163.

Calliostomatidae